Ragash District is one of ten districts of the Sihuas Province in Peru.

Geography 
Other mountains are listed below:

Some of the small lakes in the district are Asul Qucha, Ch'aki Qucha, Ch'ampa Qucha, Muru Qucha,  Rima Qucha, Utkhu Qucha, Waka Qucha, Waswa Qucha and  Wathiya Qucha.

References

Districts of the Sihuas Province
Districts of the Ancash Region